American Power and the New Mandarins is a book by the US academic Noam Chomsky, largely written in 1968, published in 1969. It was his first political book and sets out in detail his opposition to the Vietnam War.

Overview
Chomsky develops the proposition, laid out in The Responsibility of Intellectuals, that the American intellectual and technical class, in universities and in government (the New Mandarins), bear major responsibility for the atrocities perpetrated by the United States in Vietnam.

He argues, moreover, that US policy in Vietnam was all too "successful." In his view, US policy was to destroy the nationalist movements in the South Vietnamese peasantry rather than to defend South Vietnam from North Vietnamese aggression. He holds that the former was accomplished rather "successfully" at the expense of the latter.

His fundamental point on the New Mandarins is that we should not uncritically accept the claim that technocratic approaches are neutral and beneficial. He writes: 'Quite generally, what grounds are there for supposing that those whose claim to power is based on knowledge and technique will be more benign in their exercise of power than those whose claim is based on wealth or aristocratic origin? On the contrary, one might expect the new mandarin to be dangerously arrogant, aggressive and incapable of adjusting to failure, as compared with his predecessor, whose claim to power was not diminished by honesty as to the limitations of his knowledge, lack of work to do or demonstrable mistakes.'

He also suggests that common presumptions about the greatness of the West and the modern age are misguided. He writes that these assumptions are created automatically regardless of real social conditions: 'one would expect any group with access to power and affluence to construct an ideology that will justify this state of affairs on the grounds of the general welfare.'

The book was reprinted by The New Press in 2002 and contains a new foreword by Howard Zinn, an American historian and the author of A People's History of the United States.

Synopsis
Chomsky predicts that Vietnamese opposition to U.S. involvement in the war would continue and that the U.S. would be unable to defeat the Viet Cong. He explains that many of the chapters of this book originated as articles or lectures that he gave during his involvement in the still-ongoing anti-war movement. From a moralistic perspective, his primary insight in this work was that "by accepting the presumption of legitimacy of debate on certain issues, one has already lost one's humanity."

Chomsky saw a Viet Cong victory in the war to be inevitable.

Publication
New York, Pantheon Books [1969]
United Kingdom, Pelican Books [1969]
New York, The New Press [2002]

References

External links
 Full text at the Internet Archive
 Book chapters available online: Chapter 2, Chapter 3, Chapter 6, Chapter 7
 Debate between Noam Chomsky & William F. Buckley, Jr., on Firing Line, over the book

1969 non-fiction books
American political books
Books by Noam Chomsky
English-language books
Pantheon Books books
Vietnam War books
The New Press books